Sanctions against Syria are a series of economic sanctions and restrictions imposed by the European Union, the United States, Canada, Australia, Switzerland, the Arab League, as well as other countries, mainly as a result of the repression of civilians in the Syrian civil war from 2011 onwards. The US sanctions against Syria are the most severe, as they affect third-parties as well, and amount to an embargo. U.S. secondary sanctions were limited until 2020 when the Caesar Act entered into force. The intent is to prevent the Syrian government from employing violence against its citizens and to motivate political reforms that could solve the root causes of the conflict.

According to statista.com, Syria is the world's third most sanctioned country in the world as of March 2022.

A number of humanitarian aid exemptions have been embedded within the sanctions mechanisms to allow approved humanitarian aid to civilians living in Syria; nonetheless, many humanitarian aid efforts towards Syria have been blocked due to the effects of sanctions. 

There were increasing calls for sanctions against Syria to be lifted after the 2023 Turkey–Syria earthquakes due to there impact on humanitarian aid. The U.S later temporarily lifted some sanctions which allowed many charity organizations to send money to Syria.

Sanctions timeline 
In 1979, the United States put Syria on the list of State Sponsors of Terrorism over Syria's military occupation of Lebanon and state-sponsored support to Hezbollah, and other terrorist groups.

In November 1986, the European Community (EC) imposed a package of sanctions that included a ban on the sale of new arms to Syria, a ban on high-level visits, review of embassy and consular staff, and strict security measures with regard to Syrian Arab Airlines. These measures were lifted in 1994.

Between March and August 2004, the United States issued new sanctions against the Syrian government. These new sanctions are a follow-up to the policy of combating the Axis of evil conducted by the Bush administration, which "condemns the alleged possession of weapons of mass destruction by the Syrian regime, condemns its grip on Lebanon and its willingness to destabilize Iraq, as well as its support for terrorist organizations such as Hezbollah and Hamas."

The first sanctions applied on the country after the outbreak of the crisis was on 29 April 2011, after an executive order was issued by President Barack Obama to block property of those involved in the violations. Canada imposed its first sanctions on May 25, 2011 in the form of a travel ban, asset freeze, ban on the export of certain goods and technology that may be used by the armed forces, and suspension of all bilateral agreements and initiatives.

In May 2011, the European Union adopted sanctions against Syria, in particular by prohibiting the trade in goods that could be used for the repression of the civilian population.

Sanctions following the civil war 
In August 2011, the United States put in place an embargo on the oil sector, freezing the financial assets of a number of personalities, as well as those of the Syrian state itself. In addition, the United States prohibits the export of goods and services originating in the territory of the United States or from United States companies or persons to Syria. This prohibition concerns any product of which at least 10% of the value comes from the United States or one of its nationals. This measure has a wide impact on the Syrian population and on the price of commodities and medical products.

In September 2011, the European Union, in turn, adopted an embargo against the Syrian oil sector.

Australia announced a set of sanctions against Syria in 2011, in response to Assad government's violence against civilians. Sanctions ban Australians from all transactions related to weaponry, oil & natural gas, precious metals, petro-chemicals, toxic substances, banking partnerships, etc. with firms operating in Syria. They also prohibit dealings with regime-affiliated individuals, organizations and designated militant groups; which are involved in war-crimes and human rights violations.

In November 2011, the Arab League announced in turn the freezing of Syrian government's financial assets, the end of financial exchanges with the Central Bank of Syria, the cessation of airlines between the countries of the Arab League and Syria, the ban on the stay of several Syrian figures and the cessation of investments in Syria by the Arab League states. Lebanon and Yemen have opposed these sanctions. In the same month, Turkey also announced the freezing of the Syrian state's financial assets.

Other sanctions measures were put in place by the European Union in February 2012 concerning the energy sector, the supply of arms and the financial sector of Syria, as well as the mining sector. In addition, in 2012, 120 Syrian officials or institutions had their financial assets frozen by the European Union and cannot travel to the European Union. This includes Bashar al-Assad, the Central Bank of Syria and several ministers. In June 2012, the European Union banned the trade in luxury goods with Syria, as well as a number of commercial products. At the same time, the European Union strengthened its measures of restrictions on Syria in the fields of armaments, law enforcement and telecommunications control sectors.

However, several EU member states have received sanctioned Syrian ministers in their lands, under the guise of attending UN and intergovernmental conferences since 2018.

In March 2017, a UN Security Council draft resolution aimed to establish sanctions against Syria following the use of chemical weapons in its territory. However, Russia and China vetoed it. It is the 7th draft resolution for sanctions that have been rejected as a result of the exercise of vetoes. The resolution envisaged prohibiting the trade in helicopter parts and setting up the freezing of financial assets of some military figures from the Syrian government.

In April 2017, the United States imposed financial freeze and travel ban to financial services against 270 government employees of the Syrian government following the Khan Sheikhoun attack.

In March 2021, the EU declared that sanctions would remain in place until a political transformation in Syria commences. On 31 May 2022, the EU extended its sanctions against the Syrian government for a further year.

After the 2023 Turkey–Syria earthquake 

On 9 February 2023, the US Treasury Department announced it would temporarily lift some sanctions, covering “all transactions related to earthquake relief”, for 180 days to allow new earthquake relief efforts. The US said the sanctions already contained robust exemptions for humanitarian assistance, and they "will not stand in the way" of saving lives.

On 13 February 2023, the U.K announced it would ease sanctions for humanitarian aid to more easily reach Syria by providing general license exemptions for humanitarian organizations and their service providers. The license will be valid for 6 months.

On 23 February 2023, the European Union announced it would ease some sanctions for six months in order to speed up the relief effort for the Syrian nation.

Sanctioned individuals 
This is a partial list of Syrian officials who have been subjected to sanctions, some of them prior to 2011. President Assad was sanctioned for the first time on 18 May 2011.

 Bashar al-Assad (1965–)
 Asma al-Assad (1975-)
 Farouk al-Sharaa (1938–)
 Mohammad al-Shaar (1950–)
 Ali Habib Mahmud (1939–2020)
 Faisal Mekdad (1954-)
 Abdel-Fatah Qudsiyeh (1953–)
 Maher al-Assad (1967–)
 Jamil Hassan (1952–)
 Walid Muallem (1941–2020)
 Ali Abdul Karim (1953–)
 Dawoud Rajiha (1947–2012)
 Rustum Ghazaleh (1953–2015)
 Assef Shawkat (1950–2012)
 Mohammed Nasif Kheirbek (1937–2015)
 Ali Mamlouk (1946–)

Impacts on civilians
Sanctions have led to the shortage of medical equipment and medicine in Syria as its illegal for many international pharmaceutical companies to sell medicine to Syria due to sanctions, regardless of sanction exemption measures imposed by the United States and European Union towards medicine due to contradicting sanctions, medicines containing sanctioned chemicals, complex bureaucracy involved in getting approved for a sanction exemption license and etc. Due to Syria’s reliance on imports for anti-cancer medicine, its cancer treatment hospital capabilities have been heavily hampered. An Italian hospital director in Damascus told Middle East Eye in 2017 that its hospital had been partially financed by donations until sanctions prevented financial transactions to Syrian banks.

Although sanctions do not prevent transfer of funds to registered NGOs working in Syria, sanctions have led to many fund-raising and money transfer companies (such as PayPal, Venmo and GoFundMe) to block or suspend attempts by charities and individuals seeking to send money to both government- and opposition-controlled areas due to sanctions against banks and payment processors. The licensing requirements and complex bureaucracy of sanctions paperwork required for nonprofit organizations seeking to send humanitarian aid to Syria, combined with increasing audits for NGOs working in areas controlled by Islamists, had cost charity organizations millions of dollars by 2016. The bank accounts of many charities, including those working in non-government areas, were blocked or frozen due to banks' over-compliance with sanctions.

Due to U.S sanctions banning the export, sale or supply of goods, software, technology and services to Syria, people in Syria are barred from accessing Western online platforms used for education, online shopping, work or leisure, such as Google, Netflix, Amazon (company), Zoom (software), Apple Inc. and etc.

Financial transaction sanctions made it illegal for video game companies to allow people in Syria to access their platforms. Sanctions in 2019 on services towards Syria and Iran made it illegal for free-to-play video game companies to let people in Syria access their platform, regardless of removing financial transactions within their games for people in Syria in trying to avoid previous sanctions, which forced video game companies to not allow people on their platforms in Iran and Syria.

After the 2023 earthquakes, charity fundraising attempts towards supporting family members in government and opposition regions of Syria on the GoFundMe platform were blocked due to sanctions while the platform continued to only allow transfers to pre-approved registered NGOs and suspended other accounts attempting to send money to Syria for fear of non-compliance with U.S sanctions relating to banks and payment processors. After the U.S temporarily lifted certain sanctions, GoFundMe notified suspended charity accounts that they could send donations to Syria on their platform.

Positions 
The 2004 sanctions were supported by Israel’s Minister of Foreign Affairs Silvan Shalom in a public statement.

More recently, and especially in the 2020s with the normalisation of Syria's international relations, a number of countries, such as China, Iran, Russia, the United Arab Emirates and humanitarian organizations have called for the sanctions to be lifted. 

Hezbollah has criticized sanctions against Syria and accused the U.S of trying to starve Syria. On multiple occasions Hezbollah ignored sanctions and sent both weapons and humanitarian aid to Syria, leading to many of its weapon convoys being bombed by Israel.

According to Chinese state media, the complexity for average Syrians stems from the fact that territories abundant in resources such as oil, wheat and cotton are held by non-state organizations such as the US-supported Syrian Democratic Forces. Faisal Mekdad, Syria's Foreign Minister, estimated that the country has been deprived of $107 billion in oil and gas earnings since 2011 due to sanctions and the U.S exporting Syrian crude oil from areas under U.S and U.S ally control.

Alena Douhan, the United Nations Special Rapporteur on unilateral coercive measures, demanded that the US and the EU abolish their unilateral sanctions, alleging that they violate international law.

After the 2023 Turkey–Syria earthquake

On 7 February 2023, in the wake of the Turkey–Syria earthquakes, the Syrian Arab Red Crescent urged Western countries to lift sanctions. According to the Century Foundation's Aaron Lund, NGOs want some sanctions lifted because they "hurt civilians and humanitarian efforts".

After the earthquakes the Syrian government stated they wanted the U.S and Europe to lift sanctions. After the U.S government temporarily exempted certain sanctions which allowed charities and humanitarian aid to be delivered to Syria the Syrian Ministry responded in a statement that the US' decision was "misleading and aims to give a false humanitarian impression". 

Critics argued that Bashar al-Assad had weaponized humanitarian relief efforts as a tool to punish people in opposition-held territories, throughout the course of the civil war. Muslim-American civic organization Emgage said that sanctions did not bear impact on humanitarian aid, instead criticizing Russian and Iranian governments for obscuring "Assad’s role in destroying the country" and economic mismanagement.

Fabrice Balanche, Associate professor and Syria expert at the Lumiere University of Lyon II, stated regarding the status of sanctions: "Assad would like to use the earthquake to remove these sanctions, but I don’t think he will be successful.. Europe and the US won’t remove sanctions, especially now when Syria supports Russia and the war in Ukraine is raging."

During the 2023 Munich security conference, Prince Faisal bin Farhan Al Saud remarked that some dialogue would be necessary with Damascus, at least to address humanitarian issues, including a return of refugees, especially after the 2023 earthquake, and that "not just among the GCC (Gulf Cooperation Council) but in the Arab world there is a consensus growing that the status quo (to isolate Syria) is not workable”.

Following a visit to Syria by Jordan's foreign minister Ayman Safadi on 15 February 2023, members of the Jordanian government also expressed hope that Syria's isolation would end and sanctions could be lifted. A day earlier, China' envoy to the United Nations also called for unilateral sanctions to be lifted "to give children hit by war and quakes hopes for survival".

See also 
United States sanctions
Caesar Syria Civilian Protection Act
Sanctions against Iraq
Humanitarian aid during the Syrian civil war

Notes

References 

Syrian civil war
Modern history of Syria
International sanctions

External links
Office of Foreign Assets Control Syria Sanctions Program